Kirill Vladimirovich Polokhov (born 23 March 1998) is a Kazakh professional ice hockey defenceman who currently plays for HC Tambov of the Supreme Hockey League (VHL).

Playing career 
Polokhov developed with the Yunost Karagandy and Tyumensky Legion of the Russian Junior Hockey League. In 2014, he joined Arystan Temirtau of the Kazakhstan Hockey Championship at age of 16. In his first season in senior level, he recorded 3 assists in 34 games. In 2015, he signed by Barys Astana of the Kontinental Hockey League to play in its junior affiliate team Snezhnye Barsy of the Junior Hockey League (MHL). In his inaugural season in the MHL, he recorded 1 goal and 1 assist in 41 games with +9. In the 2016–17 season, he was selected to play in the MHL All-Star Game. He finished the season with 13 points in 50 games.

During 2017 pre-season, Yevgeni Koreshkov selected Polokhov to play in Barys Astana in the Kontinental Hockey League (KHL). On 18 August 2017, he scored his first goal for Barys during Viktor Blinov Memorial Tournament against Amur Khabarovsk. On 24 August 2017, he made his KHL debut in the match against Spartak Moscow. On 25 September 2017, Polokhov scored his first KHL goal in the match against SKA Saint Petersburg.

He represented Kazakhstan at the 2023 Winter World University Games, winning a bronze medal.

Career statistics

Regular season and playoffs

International

References

External links 

1998 births
Barys Nur-Sultan players
Kazakhstani ice hockey defencemen
Kazakhstani people of Russian descent
Living people
Nomad Astana players
Sportspeople from Karaganda
Snezhnye Barsy players
Tyumen Legion players
21st-century Kazakhstani people
Universiade medalists in ice hockey
Medalists at the 2023 Winter World University Games
Universiade bronze medalists for Kazakhstan